The New Standards is a minimalist jazz trio formed in Minneapolis, Minnesota, in 2005 and composed of Chan Poling (of The Suburbs), John Munson (of The Twilight Hours, Semisonic, Trip Shakespeare and The Flops) and Steve Roehm (of Electropolis, Rhombus and Billy Goat). With Poling on piano, Munson on bass and Roehm on vibraphone, the band reinterprets songs from a wide variety of genres, from classics like Rodgers and Hammerstein's My Favorite Things to London Calling by The Clash. 

In October 2005, the band released a self-titled album produced by former Trip Shakespeare / Semisonic band member, Dan Wilson. In December 2008, the band released its second album Rock and Roll. In December 2012, the trio released its third album, Sunday Morning Coming Down.

Discography

Studio albums 
 2005: The New Standards
 2008: Rock and Roll
 2012: Sunday Morning Coming Down
 2015: Decade

Holiday EPs 
 2011: Christmas Time Next Year
 2011: Seven Songs of Comfort and Joy
 2007: Candy Cane

Members
 Chan Poling – vocals, piano
 John Munson – vocals, bass
 Steve Roehm – vibraphone

External links
 Official site
 Bandcamp site
 'Such Great Heights' Music Video

American jazz ensembles from Minnesota